Seyrig is a surname. Notable people with this surname include:

 Delphine Seyrig (1932–1990), Lebanese-born French actress and film director
  (1927-1979), French composer
 Henri Seyrig (1895–1973), French archaeologist, numismatist, and historian of antiquities
 Théophile Seyrig (1843–1923), German engineer, best known for designing bridges